Bobby Cleveland (born June 2, 1943) is an American politician who served in the Oklahoma House of Representatives from the 20th district from 2012 to 2018.

On August 28, 2018, he was defeated in the Republican primary for the 20th district.

References

1943 births
Living people
Republican Party members of the Oklahoma House of Representatives
Choctaw Nation of Oklahoma state legislators in Oklahoma